Umera Ahmed (Punjabi) is a Pakistani writer, author and screenwriter. She is best known for her novels and plays Shehr-e-Zaat, Pir-e-Kamil, Zindagi Gulzar Hai, Alif, Durr-e-Shehwar, Daam, Man-o-Salwa, Qaid-e-Tanhai, Digest Writer, Maat, Kankar, Meri Zaat Zarra-e-Benishan, Doraha and Hum Kahan Ke Sachay Thay. Umera Ahmed is one of the most widely-read and popular Urdu fiction novelists and screenplay writers of this era.

Personal life
Umera Ahmed was born on December 10, 1976 in Gujranwala, Pakistan. She completed her master’s
degree in English Literature from Murray College, Sialkot, the same college that produced one of the
most celebrated and gifted scholars and poets of 21 st century, Allama Muhammad Iqbal.
She enjoys a closely guarded private life and seldom gives interviews. Her only appearance onscreen
was on the stage of Indus Vision awards to collect her first Best Writer Award in 2005. Despite being
active on social media, and involved in showbiz, she leads a private life.

Education 
Umera completed her Master's in English literature from Murray College, Sialkot Umera has remained an English teacher at Army Public School, Sialkot, where she taught middle school and High school students. However, Umera wanted to pursue her writing career fulltime, so she quit her job as a teacher and started writing for Urdu Magazines.

Career

Writing 
Ahmed started writing at an early age. Her stories were often published in monthly Urdu Digest magazines. Soon she started publishing books as well. Umera has written more than 30 books in her career, some novels, and other compilations of short stories. Her most famous work, and the one that heightened her career was Peer-e-Kamil and Meri Zaat Zara-e-Benishan. Umera started her writing career in 1998 when she started publishing stories in the monthly Urdu magazines. Her first story written for the digest magazine was Zindagi Gulzar Hai. The story captured the interest of readers and Umera was soon asked to write a full-length novel. She was 21 when she wrote the story. In 2012, the novel was serialized into a popular drama with the same name. The drama starred Sanam Saeed and Fawad Khan as the lead actors. In an interview Umera said that the character of the lead female, Kashaf in the novel is based on her own character. Umera's stories often revolve around men-women relationships, societal issues and pressures. Her stories depict women as the central theme. Ahmed is also the writer of many other novels that have been serialized into dramas. Her other popular works are  Meri Zaat Zarra-e-Benishan for which Ahmed has won the ‘Best Writer’ Award at the tenth Lux Style Awards. The novel was also converted into a drama with the same name. The drama gained much popularity and in 2014, it was also aired in India under the name, Kesi Yeh Qayamat.

Ahmed has also written novels on religion and spirituality. Pir-e-Kamil (2004), Shehr-e-Zaat (2012) and Alif (2019), are some of her novels that focus on spirituality. Her novel Alif, was dramatized into a popular series that starred Hamza Ali Abbassi, Sajal Aly and Kubra Khan.Shehr-e-zaat was also a popular drama starring Mahira Khan. Ahmed has written more than 35 books in her career. Over 22 of her books have been converted into drama series. Her books have also been translated into English and Arabic languages. Juggernaut books translated Ahmed's works into Hindi as well.

Screenwriting 
Many of Ahmed's novels have been created into drama series. However, Ahmed has also written stories specifically for dramas and movies. She has collaborated with the director Mehreen Jabbar to produce drama serials that have gained widespread popularity. Recently, she collaborated again to bring a web-series called Aik Jhooti Love Story. The series is a comedy revolving around a couple in Karachi. It stars Billal Abbas Khan and Madiha Imam as lead actors. Aik Jhooti Love Story was released on 30 October 2020 and was launched on ZEE5; a digital entertainment platform.

Ahmed also wrote a screenplay Baaghi, which is based on the late Pakistani model, Qandeel Baloch. The play starred Saba Qamar as the lead actress. Ahmed has also worked on Netflix projects. Her recent work underway is a series about cyberbullying. The series revolves around a female detective investigating a crime. This was the first thriller series by Umera. In an interview Umera said, "This one comes straight from the heart, because I’ve seen so many people suffer because of it. I know how trolling can destroy lives!"

Alif Kitab 
In 2016, Ahmed created Alif Kitab; a digital platform for budding writers to share their work and monetize it. The platform aims to provide editorial guidance to new writers by allowing them to interact with experts. The platform also allows them to submit their writings to media and production houses.

Awards and recognition

In 2014 Pakistan Media Awards Best writer of the year award for drama serial Zindagi Gulzar Hai.
In 2014 Hum Awards Best Writer Drama Serial for Zindagi Gulzar Hai.

Lux Style Awards

Selected work

Books
 Pir-e-Kamil
 Amar Bail 
 Shehr-e-Zaat
 Man-o-Salwa
 Aab-e-Hayat
 La-Hasil
 Zindagi Gulzar Hai
 Alif
 Kankar
 Qaid-e-Tanhai
  Imaan Umeed Ur Mohabbat

Dramas

 Zindagi Gulzar Hai – Hum TV
 Kankar – Hum TV
 The Ghost – Hum TV
 Doraha – Geo TV
 Daam – ARY Digital
 Qaid-e-Tanhai – Hum TV
 Malaal – Hum TV
 Mirat-ul-Uroos – Geo TV
 Shehr-e-Zaat – Hum TV
 Man-o-Salwa – Hum TV
 Alif – Geo TV
 Meri Zaat Zarra-e-Benishan – Geo TV
 Daraar – ARY Digital
 Digest Writer – Hum TV
 Dooriyan – Hum Sitaray
 Jhoot – Hum TV
 Naulakha – TV One
 Khoat – Ary Digital
 Abro – Hum TV
 Baby – Express Entertainment
 Amrat aur Maya – Express Entertainment
 Saanp Seerhi – Express Entertainment
 Baji Irshaad – Express Entertainment
 Ishq Main Kaafir – A Plus
 Durr-e-Shehwar – Hum TV
 Maat – Hum TV
 Baaghi (Screenplay) – Urdu 1
 Mohabat Subh Ka Sitara Hai – Hum TV
 Hum Kahan Ke Sachay Thay – Hum TV
 Sinf-e-Aahan – ARY Digital

Telefilms and web-series
 Behadd
 Laal
 Aik Hai Nigaar
 Mutthi Bhar Mitti
 Ek Thi Marium
 Ek Jhoothi Love Story
 Dhoop Ki Deewar

See also
Nimra Ahmed Khan

References 

1976 births
Living people
Pakistani women writers
Pakistani screenwriters
People from Sialkot
Punjabi people
Murray College alumni
Urdu-language fiction writers
Urdu-language novelists
Pakistani novelists